Connor Roberts may refer to:

Connor Roberts (footballer, born 1992), Welsh footballer
Connor Roberts (footballer, born 1995), Welsh footballer